Arayik Mirzoyan (born July 29, 1987 in Baghramian, Armenia) is an Armenian weightlifter. He won a silver medal at the 2011 European Weightlifting Championships. Both Mirzoyan and the gold medalist totaled 347 kg, but Mirzoyan took silver due to personal weight difference.

References

External links 
 Arayik Mirzoyan at Lift Up

1987 births
Living people
People from Ararat Province
Armenian male weightlifters
European Weightlifting Championships medalists
21st-century Armenian people